Igor Viktorovich Tyutin (born 24 August 1940) is a Russian theoretical physicist, who works on quantum field theory.

Tyutin is a professor at the Lebedev Institute in Moscow. In an unpublished Lebedev Institute report, he developed the BRST formalism around 1975 in Russia in parallel to and independently of the work of  Carlo Becchi,  Alain Rouet, and  Raymond Stora in France. The BRST formalism is a method for quantization of fields with constraints such as gauge invariance. In quantum field theory, the procedure is of fundamental importance for attempts at constructing string field theories. In 2009 Tyutin received the Dannie Heineman Prize for Mathematical Physics with Carlo Becchi, Alain Rouet, and Raymond Stora.

References

External links
 Tyutin at the webpages of the I. E. Tamm Theory Department of the Lebedev Institute
 Tyutin's publication list according to mathnet

Russian physicists
Living people
Mathematical physicists
Year of birth missing (living people)